Katja Lavonius (born 6 April 1965) is a Finnish retired ice hockey player and former general manager of the Espoo Blues Naiset. As a member of the Finnish national ice hockey team, she won bronze medals at the IIHF Women's World Championships in 1990 and 1994, and gold medals at the IIHF European Women Championships in 1991 and 1993.

Playing career
One of the pioneers of women's ice hockey in Finland, Lavonius won the inaugural Naisten SM-sarja championship with Helsingin Jääkiekkoklubi (HJK) in 1983. After sitting out the 1983–84 season, she played with HJK through the 1985–86 season and then spent two seasons with Etelä-Vantaan Urheilijat (EVU). 

In 1988, she joined the Keravan Shakers, with whom she remained for nine seasons and won the Finnish Championship in 1994, 1995, and 1996. 

Lavonius moved to Kiekko-Espoo Naiset for the 1997–98 season and continued with the team while it was renamed as the Espoo Blues Naiset in 1998. With the Espoo Blues, she won three more Finnish Championship titles, in 1999, 2001, and 2002.

Career statistics

International

Sources:

References

External links
 

1965 births
Living people
Espoo Blues Naiset players
Finnish ice hockey administrators
Finnish women's ice hockey forwards
Keravan Shakers players
Kiekko-Espoo Naiset players
Ice hockey people from Helsinki